Hypercompe dissimilis is a moth of the family Erebidae first described by William Schaus in 1896. It is found in Colombia.

References

dissimilis
Moths described in 1896